Dragan Radović (Cyrillic: Драган Радовић; born 29 September 1976) is a Montenegrin retired professional footballer who played as a striker.

Playing career 
Radović began his career in the Second League of FR Yugoslavia in 1998 where he had stints with Iskra Danilovgrad, and Rudar Pljevlja. In 2001, he signed  with FK Obilić in the First League of FR Yugoslavia. After a season in the top flight he returned to the second league to play with Trudbenik, FK Mogren, and Zora Spuž. In 2005, he signed with FK Mornar. Following Montenegro regaining independence in 2006, he signed with the Serbian White Eagles of the Canadian Soccer League thus becoming Montenegro's first international football transfer.

He made his debut for the Serbian White Eagles on August 11, 2006 against Toronto Supra Portuguese, where he recorded a goal in a 2-1 victory. In his debut season he assisted in clinching the International Division title and in reaching the CSL Championship final against Italia Shooters. In the 2008 season he finished as the club's top goalscorer with 12 goals. He assisted in securing the championship title against Trois-Rivières Attak, where Serbia won the match after a 2-1 victory in a penalty shootout.

After one season in his first club Iskra Danilovgrad he retired from competitive football in 2011. He is commonly referred to by his nickname Ruso after the famous philosopher.

Honours

Serbian White Eagles 
CSL Championship: 2008
Canadian Soccer League International Division: 2006, 2007, 2009

References

1976 births
Living people
People from Danilovgrad
Association football forwards
Serbia and Montenegro footballers
Montenegrin footballers
FK Iskra Danilovgrad players
FK Rudar Pljevlja players
FK Obilić players
FK Mogren players
FK Zora players
FK Mornar players
Serbian White Eagles FC players
Second League of Serbia and Montenegro players
First League of Serbia and Montenegro players
Canadian Soccer League (1998–present) players
Montenegrin Second League players
Montenegrin expatriate footballers
Expatriate soccer players in Canada
Montenegrin expatriate sportspeople in Canada